The Arihant-class ( in Sanskrit) is a class of Indian nuclear-powered ballistic missile submarines being built for the Indian Navy. They were developed under the  Advanced Technology Vessel (ATV) project to design and build nuclear-powered submarines. These vessels are classified as 'strategic strike nuclear submarines' by India.

The lead vessel of the class,  was laid down in 2004, launched in 2009 and after extensive sea trials was confirmed to be commissioned in August 2016.
Arihant holds the distinction of being the first ballistic missile submarine to have been built by a country other than one of the five permanent members of the United Nations Security Council.

History
In December 1971, during the Indo-Pakistani War of 1971, US President Richard Nixon sent a carrier battle group named Task Force 74, led by the nuclear-powered  into the international waters of the Bay of Bengal in a show of force. Task Force 74 remained in international waters, where it was legally entitled to be. The records of Nixon-Kissinger communications show no contingency nor any plan under which Enterprise would enter Indian or Pakistani waters, or otherwise intervene in the conflict but it is well known that the duo viewed Pakistan as a strong ally in that region and were silent on Bangladesh genocide committed by Pakistani military. In response, the Soviet Union sent a submarine armed with nuclear missiles from Vladivostok to trail the US task force. The event demonstrated the significance of nuclear weapons and ballistic missile submarines to then Prime Minister Indira Gandhi. Following the 1974 Smiling Buddha nuclear test, the Director of Marine Engineering (DME) at Naval Headquarters initiated a technical feasibility study for an indigenous nuclear propulsion system (Project 932).

The Indian Navy's Advanced Technology Vessel project to design and construct a nuclear submarine took shape in the 1990s. Then Defence Minister George Fernandes confirmed the project in 1998. The initial intent of the project was to design nuclear-powered fast attack submarines, though following nuclear tests conducted by India in 1998 at Pokhran Test Range and the Indian pledge of no first use, the project was re-aligned towards the design of a ballistic missile submarine in order to complete India's nuclear triad.

Description
The Arihant-class submarines are nuclear powered ballistic missile submarines built under the Advanced Technology Vessel (ATV) project. They will be the first nuclear submarines designed and built by India. The complement is about 95, including officers and sailors. The boats are powered by a single seven blade propeller powered by an 83 MW pressurised water reactor and can achieve a maximum speed of  when surfaced and  when submerged.

The submarines have four launch tubes in their hump and can carry up to twelve K-15 Sagarika missiles with one warhead each (with a range of ) or four K-4 missiles (with a range of ). The third and fourth submarines will have a larger configuration, carrying twenty-four K-15 Sagarika or eight K-4 missiles.

The submarine's K-15 missiles can reach most of Pakistan and it's K-4 can target all of Pakistan. The K-4 may also be capable of targeting Beijing, but would need to be in the northern most waters of Bay of Bengal. Deployment of the Arihant to the Pacific Ocean is unlikely given the submarine's noise issues.

Development
The submarines are powered by a pressurised water reactor with highly enriched uranium fuel. The miniaturised version of the reactor was designed and built by the Bhabha Atomic Research Centre (BARC) at the Indira Gandhi Centre for Atomic Research (IGCAR) in Kalpakkam. It included a  section of the submarine's pressure hull containing the shielding tank with water and the reactor, a control room, as well as an auxiliary control room for monitoring safety parameters. The prototype reactor became critical on 11 November 2003 and was declared operational on 22 September 2006. Successful operation of the prototype for three years enabled the production version of the reactor for Arihant. The reactor subsystems were tested at the Machinery Test Center in Visakhapatnam. Facilities for loading and replacing the fuel cores of the naval reactors in berthed submarines were also established. The prototype 83 MW light water reactor that was installed at Kalpakkam by BARC is codenamed S1 and is used to train nuclear submariners.

In 2007, then finance minister P. Chidambaram, who was a member of the political committee which monitors the ATV programme, questioned the huge amount of money being spent on submarines with just 4 missile launch tubes. Hence the ATV project team tweaked the Arihant design by adding a 10-metre-long section for four more K-4 SLBMs to be integrated into the boat codenamed S4. After it became evident that the larger S5 class of SSBNs will take more time to develop, an additional unit, codenamed S4*, was sanctioned in 2012 to ensure that the production line doesn't go idle.

The detailed engineering of the design was implemented at Larsen & Toubro's submarine design centre at their Hazira shipbuilding facility. Tata Power SED built the control systems for the submarine. The steam turbines and associated systems integrated with the reactor were supplied by Walchandnagar Industries. The lead vessel underwent a long and extensive process of testing after its launch in July 2009. The propulsion and power systems were tested with high-pressure steam trials followed by harbor-acceptance trials that included submersion tests by flooding its ballast tanks and controlled dives to limited depths. INS Arihants reactor went critical for the first time on 10 August 2013. On 13 December 2014, the submarine set off for its extensive sea trials.On 5 November 2018, INS Arihant completed its first deterrence patrol.

Ships in class
Four boats of this class are planned. The first boat of the class, was commissioned in August 2016. In December 2014, the work on a second nuclear reactor began and the second boat,  sea trials started in 2017 and commissioned in August, 2022 (speculated). The final two ships S4 and S4* in the class are expected to be larger, displacing over 1,000 tonnes more than the Arihant and have 8 missile launch tubes to carry up to 8 K4 or K5 and a more powerful pressurized water reactor than INS Arihant. S4 was launched in November 2021

Timeline

See also
 Future of the Indian Navy
 List of submarines of the Indian Navy
 List of submarine classes in service
 Submarine-launched ballistic missile

References

External links

 The Indian Strategic Nuclear Submarine Project by Mark Gorwitz

Ballistic missile submarines
Arihant-class submarines
Submarines of India
Nuclear-powered submarines
Submarine classes